Natsume Akatsuki (暁なつめ, Akatsuki Natsume) is a Japanese light novel author and manga writer from Echizen, Fukui Prefecture, Japan. He is best known for writing the KonoSuba series.

Career 
In 2012, Akatsuki entered his debut work  for the 8th MF Bunko J Light Novel Rookie Award under the pen name . However, it only made it to the second round. After that, he began posting his writing to the user-generated novel website Shōsetsuka ni Narō under the same name.

On August 19, 2012, under the name , he began serializing Combatants Will Be Dispatched!, which concluded on September 10 of the same year with 68 chapters. In the same month, under the name , he published . After this, he closed his account.

After a short time, Akatsuki created a new account on Shōsetsuka ni Narō under the username  and begun uploading once again. He published  before taking it down, only making the work available again on February 1, 2013.

On December 20, 2012, he began serializing KonoSuba, which finished on October 21, 2013, with 124 chapters. It was announced in the same year that KonoSuba would be published by Kadokawa Shoten under their Sneaker imprint. On December 10, 2013, KonoSuba was taken off the Shōsetsuka ni Narō website.

March 27, 2013, saw the release of the KonoSuba side-story .

Akatsuki officially debuted on October 1, 2013, with the first volume of KonoSuba being published in book form.

On October 1, 2014, he released his first novel, Dragontarashi, for free on his blog.

In 2016, he would write and begin publishing the manga Kemono Michi. It would receive an anime adaptation in 2019.

KonoSuba received an anime adaptation in 2016. It would later on have a sequel anime in 2017 followed by a movie in 2019.

Akatsuki's Combatants Will Be Dispatched! started publishing on November 1, 2017. It received an anime adaptation in 2021.

Works

Novels

KonoSuba 

KonoSuba (illustrated by Kurone Mishima, published by Kadokawa Sneaker Bunko, 17 volumes, 2013–2020)
KonoSuba: An Explosion on this Wonderful World! (illustrated by Kurone Mishima, published by Kadokawa Sneaker Bunko, 3 volumes, 2014–2015)
KonoSuba: An Explosion on this Wonderful World! Bonus Story (illustrated by Kurone Mishima, published by Kadokawa Sneaker Bunko, 2 volumes, 2016–2019)
Kono Kamen no Akuma ni Sōdan o! (illustrated by Kurone Mishima, published by Kadokawa Sneaker Bunko, 1 volume, 2016)
 KonoSuba: God's Blessing on this Wonderful World! Extra Attention to that Wonderful Fool! (illustrated by Kurone Mishima, published by Kadokawa Sneaker Bunko, 7 volumes, 2017–present)

Combatants Will Be Dispatched! 
Combatants Will Be Dispatched! (illustrated by Kakao Lanthanum, published by Kadokawa Sneaker Bunko, 7 volumes, 2017–present)

Manga 

Kemono Michi (illustrated by Mattakumo-suke; Yumenuta, published in Monthly Shōnen Ace, 10 volumes, 2016–present)

Other credits 

Re:Zero − Starting Life in Another World (anime announcement narration writer; Episodes 18, 25)
Combatants Will Be Dispatched! (animation script cooperation; Episode 10)

References

External links 

 Jitakukeibihei - Shōsetsuka ni Narō account (Writings expunged)
 
 Author's blog
 First work collection - KonoSuba short stories, Ninja ga Isekai Iri (Entire novel) 
 Second work collection - KonoSuba short stories, Dragontarashi (Entire novel)
 Hideaki Natsuki blog (Content expunged)

Living people
Japanese novelists
Light novelists
People from Fukui Prefecture
Year of birth missing (living people)